Daniel Joseph Gasser (born 25 October 1976), known professionally as Dan Gasser, is a British radio presenter, currently employed by Global as the weekend afternoon presenter (4pm–7pm) on Radio X.

Early life and career
Gasser was born in Enfield, London, and was educated at the Edmonton County School. He began his radio career in the 1990s; he was a presenter on Invicta FM in Kent during 1997–98 before joining the Capital Radio Group (CRG), for whom he presented on Capital FM. He then moved to the Sussex-based station Southern FM, where he spent a large part of his career. He stayed with Southern FM through their rebranding to Heart Sussex in 2009 and covered for other time slots across the Heart network.

Between 2012 and 2016 Gasser co-presented the breakfast show, firstly with Andrea Fox, and then with Hanna Neter, on the Brighton-based station Juice 107.2. He left the station in 2016 and covered shows on KMFM in Kent before re-joining Global and working on the Heart network, including Heart Cambridge and Heart Kent. He presented his first show on Radio X on 13 May 2017.

Personal life
Gasser's partner, Kate, proposed marriage to him live during one of his shows on Juice 107.2 in 2016.

References

1976 births
British radio personalities
Living people
British radio DJs
People educated at Edmonton County School
People from Enfield, London